Eduard "Edi" Heiz (born March 10, 1947) is a Swiss retired slalom canoeist who competed from the late 1960s to the early 1970s. He finished 13th in the K-1 event at the 1972 Summer Olympics in Munich.

References
Sports-reference.com profile

External links

1947 births
Canoeists at the 1972 Summer Olympics
Living people
Olympic canoeists of Switzerland
Swiss male canoeists
Place of birth missing (living people)